The Meath Hospital was a general hospital in the Earl of Meath's Liberty in Dublin, Ireland. It was absorbed into the Tallaght Hospital in June 1998.

History
The hospital was opened to serve the sick and poor in the crowded area of the Liberties in Dublin in 1753. It then moved to larger premises in Heytesbury Street in 1822.

In the nineteenth century the Meath Hospital achieved worldwide fame as a result of the revolutionary teaching methods and groundbreaking research carried out by Robert Graves and William Stokes, physicians of the hospital. One example was when during a typhus epidemic Robert Graves introduced the revolutionary idea of giving food during the illness ("he fed fevers" was what Graves requested be inscribed on his tombstone).

It was absorbed into the Tallaght Hospital in June 1998. The original building was subsequently converted for use as a respite home.

Notable physicians
Notable physicians included:
John Cheyne (1777–1836), appointed a physician in the hospital in 1811.
Sir Philip Crampton (1777–1858), appointed surgeon to the hospital in 1798 (though not fully qualified).
Patrick Harkan, of Raheen, County Roscommon, appointed a physician in the hospital in 1817. He later went on to the Cork Street Fever Hospital, where he remained for forty years.
Francis Rynd (1801-1861), physician and inventor of the hypodermic syringe.
Thomas Hawkesworth Ledwich (1823–1858), appointed to take over from Philip Crampton in 1858.
Rawdon Macnamara (1822–1893), appointed a surgeon in 1861 (a post his father had occupied).
Arthur Wynne Foot, physician and curator to the hospital's pathological museum before leaving to become a lecturer in the Ledwich School.
Sir Lambert Ormsby (1850-1923), appointed a surgeon to the hospital in 1872 and provided service for over fifty years.

References

Further reading
 
 

Hospitals in Dublin (city)
1753 establishments in Ireland
Hospitals established in the 1750s
Defunct hospitals in the Republic of Ireland
Physicians of the Meath Hospital
1998 disestablishments in Ireland
Hospitals disestablished in 1998